Chip 'n Dale: Rescue Rangers is an American animated television series produced by Walt Disney Television Animation. Created by Tad Stones and Alan Zaslove, it featured the established Disney characters Chip 'n Dale in a new setting. The series premiered on The Disney Channel on March 4, 1989, having aired the first produced episode, "Catteries Not Included", as a special preview on August 27, 1988.

A two-hour movie presentation of Rescue Rangers: To The Rescue began airing in syndication the weekend of September 29, 1989. While not produced first, the movie told the story of how the Rescue Rangers met.

The series then began airing in weekday syndication. From that point forward, the movie was broken up into five standard-length episodes that were considered part of season 2. In 1990, it became part of the syndicated programming block The Disney Afternoon. The final episode aired on November 19, 1990. As a part of the Disney Afternoon lineup, reruns of the show were aired until September 3, 1993.

In the fall of 1990, a live-action educational film/video was made entitled The Great Quake Hazard Hunt, in which Rescue Rangers Chip and Dale, along with their friends, show children how to prepare for earthquakes. (The characters were portrayed in their live forms that appear in the Disney theme parks and other live appearances.)

In the fall of 1991, another live-action educational film/video was made entitled Rescue Rangers: Fire Safety Adventure, in which Rescue Rangers Chip and Dale, along with their friends, must foil the plans of Fat Cat as he leaves a trail of fire hazards throughout the fire station and neighboring bank.

Series overview

Episodes

Season 1 (1989)

Season 2 (1989–90)

Season 3 (1990)

References

External links 
 
 
 

Chip 'n Dale Rescue Rangers
Chip 'n Dale Rescue Rangers
Lists of Disney Channel television series episodes